Lemonnier premetro station is a premetro (underground tram) station in central Brussels, Belgium, located near the crossroads between the / and the Small Ring (Brussels' inner ring road).

The station in part of the North–South Axis, a tram tunnel crossing the city centre between Brussels-North railway station and Albert premetro station. Additional tunnel exits exist at the Brussels-South railway station, as well as at the Lemonnier premetro station, allowing trams to leave or enter the tunnel at those points. Currently, tram routes 51 and 82 enter the tunnel at Lemonnier towards the south. Tram routes 3 and 4, as well as evening routes 31, and 32 also stop at Lemonnier.

The station is decorated with paintings by Hamsi Boubeker. On a lower floor, there is unused second station with two platforms. In the tunnel between Anneessens and Lemonnier, there is a tunnel towards this station.

References

Brussels metro stations
City of Brussels